Alfred Fernandes (born 10 April 1966) is a former Indian football player, who is currently the head coach of I-League 2nd division side South United.

Coaching career
Born in Goa, Fernandes was previously a youth development coach for Churchill Brothers. He was in charge of Churchill Brothers at the under-17 and under-14 levels before eventually being promoted to the under-20s.

In 2016, Fernandes coached Goa during the Santosh Trophy. He was then promoted to coach the Churchill Brothers senior team in the Goa Professional League.

Fernandes then coached Churchill Brothers in their first I-League game of the 2016–17 season on 8 January 2017 against Mohun Bagan.

Statistics

Managerial statistics
.

References

External links
 All India Football Federation Profile

1966 births
Living people
Footballers from Goa
Indian football managers
Churchill Brothers FC Goa managers
I-League managers
Association footballers not categorized by position
Indian footballers